Lela Chichinadze (also transliterated via , born December 22, 1988) is a Georgian football striker. She is a member of the Georgian national team. She played in the Turkish Women's First Football League for Ataşehir Belediyespor with jersey number 88.

Playing career

Club

Chichinadze played the Champions League with Iveria Khashuri, Norchi Dinamoeli and Baia Zugdidi.

On January 30, 2015, Lela Chichinadze signed for the Turkish club Adana İdmanyurduspor. In her first game, she scored two goals for her new club. She transferred to the Istanbul-based club Ataşehir Belediyespor on February 5, 2016 .

International
She played in six of the 2011 FIFA Women's World Cup qualification – UEFA Group 3 matches, three of the UEFA Women's Euro 2013 qualifying – Group 2 games, and three of the 2015 FIFA Women's World Cup qualification (UEFA) – Group B matches.  She scored in March 2011 the only goal in Georgia's first official win.  Chichinadze scored three goals in total for the Georgian women's national team.

Career statistics
.

International goals

Honours
Turkish Women's First League
 Ataşehir Belediyespor
 Runner-up (1): 2015–16
 Third places (1): 2016–17

References

External links

Living people
1988 births
Women's footballers from Georgia (country)
Georgia (country) women's international footballers
Expatriate women's footballers from Georgia (country)
Expatriate women's footballers in Turkey
Adana İdmanyurduspor players
Ataşehir Belediyespor players
Women's association football forwards
Expatriate sportspeople from Georgia (country) in Turkey